Interstate 94 (I-94) is an east–west Interstate Highway connecting the Great Lakes and northern Great Plains regions of the United States. Its western terminus is just east of Billings, Montana, at a junction with I-90; its eastern terminus is in Port Huron, Michigan, where it meets with I-69 and crosses the Blue Water Bridge into Sarnia, Ontario, Canada, where the route becomes Ontario Highway 402. It thus lies along the primary overland route from Seattle (via I-90) to Toronto (via Ontario Highway 401) and is the only east–west Interstate Highway to have a direct connection to Canada.

I-94 intersects with I-90 several times: at its western terminus; Tomah to Madison in Wisconsin; in Chicago, Illinois; and in Lake Station, Indiana. Major cities that I-94 connects to are Billings, Bismarck, Fargo, Minneapolis–Saint Paul, Madison, Milwaukee, Chicago, and Detroit.

Route description 
	
|-
|MT
|
|-
|ND
|
|-
|MN
|
|-
|WI
|
|-
|IL	
|
|-
|IN	
|	
|-
|MI
|
|-
|Total
|
|}

Montana 

I-94 begins at Billings and travels northeastward toward Glendive before exiting the state to the east. I-94 links seven counties, which are Yellowstone, Treasure, Rosebud, Custer, Prairie, Dawson, and Wibaux counties and passes near or through Miles City and Glendive while connecting with I-90 in Billings. The highway is notable for following the Yellowstone River from Billings through Glendive. Beyond the western terminus of I-94, I-90 connects westbound I-94 travelers to points west such as Butte; Missoula; Coeur d'Alene, Idaho; Spokane, Washington; and Seattle, Washington.

North Dakota 

The route enters at Beach and passes through the Badlands near Medora (near the Theodore Roosevelt National Park South Unit). Further east, I-94 provides access to the North Unit of Theodore Roosevelt National Park, then passes through the cities of Dickinson, Mandan, Bismarck, Jamestown, and Valley City on the way to West Fargo and Fargo, where it leaves the state and crosses into Minnesota. Throughout the state, the route generally travels relatively straight east and west following both the railroad route and the former route of US Route 10 (US 10, called "The Old Red Trail") where its western terminus is at exit 343 in West Fargo.

At New Salem, it passes Salem Sue, a  sculpture of a Holstein cow and is clearly visible from I-94 on the south side of the road. A drive up the road to Sue will take visitors to a vantage point where they can see a panoramic landscape for many miles. Between Mandan and Bismarck, I-94 crosses the Missouri River with a view of the Northern Pacific/BNSF Railway Bridge on the south side of the road. US 52 is concurrent with I-94 from Jamestown to the Minnesota state line. approximately milemarker 275 on the westbound lanes between Jamestown and Valley City, there is a small green sign marking the Laurentian Divide, which marks a continental divide where rivers south of the divide drain into the Gulf of Mexico, while the rivers north flow into the Arctic Ocean. The highway reaches Fargo, before the Red River.

Minnesota 

Leaving Fargo and entering Moorhead, Minnesota, I-94/US 52 crosses the Red River. East of Moorhead Municipal Airport, the Interstate travels in a northwest–southeast trajectory past Fergus Falls, Alexandria, and St. Cloud on the way to the Twin Cities and eastward out of the state.

The road crosses the Mississippi River in Minneapolis between the Prospect Park and Seward neighborhoods. As it crosses over the only true gorge along the Mississippi's entire  length, where steep bluffs extend to the waterline. The highway joins Minneapolis and Saint Paul together where it meets Minnesota State Highway 280 (MN 280). US 52 leaves I-94 after running concurrently with I-94 from the North Dakota state line and heads southbound toward Rochester. In the Twin Cities, the routing of the highway is politically charged, primarily through many historic working-class and Black neighborhoods. In Saint Paul, the routing of I-94 is set through and displaces the historic Rondo Neighborhood, which prior to the highway construction was the largest Black community in Saint Paul.

East of Saint Paul, I-94 leaves Minnesota between Lakeland, Minnesota, and Hudson, Wisconsin, while crossing the St. Croix River.

Wisconsin 

I-94 enters Wisconsin east of the Twin Cities at Hudson. It traverses the hilly terrain of northwest Wisconsin, crossing the Red Cedar River near Menomonie. East of Menomonie, I-94 junctions with WIS 29, a major East–West expressway connecting I-94 with Wausau, and Green Bay.  It then passes Eau Claire before turning southeastward and joining with I-90 in Tomah. Southeast of Tomah, the highway passes the major tourist area of Wisconsin Dells. Here, vacationers can find a multitude of water parks, camping, amusement parks, zoos, river excursions, as well as lodging and shopping. Further southeast, I-94 joins up with I-39 in Portage at the base of Cascade Mountain, a popular ski area. Just south of Cascade Mountain, I-94 crosses over the Wisconsin River. I-94 leaves I-90 and I-39 east of the state capitol of Madison and resumes its easterly path toward Milwaukee. I-94 weaves its way into Downtown Milwaukee before turning south and heading to Chicago, entering Illinois at Pleasant Prairie.

Illinois 

In the state of Illinois, I-94 runs south from Wisconsin to Indiana via downtown Chicago. It is tolled on the Tri-State Tollway to the I-94/I-294 split; it then runs east to the Edens Expressway, where it soon joins again with I-90 on the Kennedy Expressway and turns south through the city of Chicago. I-90 leaves south of downtown Chicago to the Chicago Skyway. At I-80, I-94 runs east to Indiana on the Kingery Expressway.

Indiana 

In the state of Indiana, I-94 runs east from Illinois concurrently with I-80. It crosses I-90 (Indiana Toll Road), where I-80 joins I-90 east toward Ohio. I-94 continues northeasterly, paralleling the Lake Michigan shoreline into Michigan. Between milemarkers 0.0 and 15.5, the highway is also posted along with I-80. Between milemarkers 15.6 and 19.0, I-94 is posted alone.

Michigan 

I-94 runs north along Lake Michigan to St. Joseph and Benton Harbor before heading east toward Detroit. It turns northeast to Port Huron where it meets I-69 and ends at the Blue Water Bridge, where it becomes Ontario Highway 402 in Point Edward, Ontario.

History 
The first section of I-94 completed with Interstate funds (under the Federal-Aid Highway Act of 1956) was a  section between Jamestown and Valley City, North Dakota, in 1958.

North of Chicago, I-94 has been widened from six to eight lanes from Illinois Route 22 (IL 22, Half Day Road) to just south of the Wisconsin state line at IL 173 and 95th Street to 159th Street. Construction began in 2009 to completely rebuild I-94, including expansion to eight lanes, from the Wisconsin–Illinois border through the Mitchell Interchange in Milwaukee. This construction is expected to be completed in 2021.

In 2006, a project to widen I-94 east of Downtown Saint Paul between MN 120 and McKnight Road from four to six lanes was completed. The interchange at 95th Avenue North in Maple Grove, Minnesota, was rebuilt with a new, wider bridge that replaced the two-lane bridge there, which was demolished in July 2006.

The expanded Marquette Interchange in Downtown Milwaukee was completed in August 2008 at a cost of $810 million (equivalent to $ in ).

In Detroit, I-94 was routed over the existing Edsel Ford Freeway and remained signed as such until the late 1980s when Michigan deemphasized proper names on Interstate guide signs. Its interchange with the Lodge Freeway, built in 1953, is significant as the first full-speed freeway-to-freeway interchange built in the US.

From September 2007 to October 2008, the Minnesota Department of Transportation (MnDOT) added a temporary extra lane to I-94 between northbound I-35W and Minnesota State Highway 280 in the Twin Cities to help relieve traffic congestion caused by the collapse of the I-35W Mississippi River bridge. As a result, this portion of I-94 was not up to Interstate Highway standards during this time period.

Major intersections 
Montana
 in Billings
 near Miles City
North Dakota
 in Belfield
 in Bismarck (unsigned, carried by the Bismarck Expressway)
 in Bismarck
 in Jamestown
 in West Fargo
 in Fargo
Minnesota
 in Maple Grove; access to the west end of the Twin Cities beltway
 in Minneapolis; the spur route from Minneapolis to Minnetonka
 in Minneapolis; concurrent for less than one mile (1.6 km)
 in St. Paul; concurrent for less than half a mile (0.8 km)
 in Oakdale-Woodbury; the east end of the Twin Cities beltway
Wisconsin
 in Eau Claire
 in Tomah; concurrent until Madison
 at Portage; concurrent until Madison
 in West Allis
 in Milwaukee
 in Milwaukee
Illinois
 in Zion
 in Deerfield
 in Chicago; concurrent through to the junction with the Chicago Skyway
 in Chicago
 in Chicago
 in Chicago
 in South Holland; concurrent until Lake Station, Indiana
Indiana
 in Gary
 in Hammond
 in Lake Station
 in Lake Station
 near Michigan City
 near Michigan City
Michigan
 near Benton Harbor
 in Kalamazoo
 in Battle Creek
 in Marshall
 in Jackson
 near Ann Arbor
 in Romulus
 in Taylor
 in Detroit
 in Detroit
 in Roseville
 in Port Huron; concurrent to the border
 at Canadian border

Spur routes 
 Bismarck, North Dakota: I-194 (unsigned)
 Minneapolis–Saint Paul, Minnesota: I-394, I-494, I-694
 Milwaukee, Wisconsin: I-794 (Lake Freeway), I-894
 Chicago, Illinois: I-294 (Tri-State Tollway)
 Battle Creek, Michigan: I-194

References

External links 

 Interstate 94 at Michigan Highways
 Interstate 94 at Wisconsin Highways
 Illinois Highway Ends: I-94
 Indiana Highway Ends: I-94
 The Old Red Trail Documentary about the history of I-94 in North Dakota produced by Prairie Public Television

 
94